New Ringgold Gristmill is a historic grist mill located at East Brunswick Township, Schuylkill County, Pennsylvania. It was built about 1852, and is a small 2 1/2-story, rectangular building.  It is constructed of wood and native stone and has a medium gable roof.

It was added to the National Register of Historic Places in 1978.

References

Grinding mills on the National Register of Historic Places in Pennsylvania
Industrial buildings completed in 1852
Buildings and structures in Schuylkill County, Pennsylvania
Grinding mills in Pennsylvania
1852 establishments in Pennsylvania
National Register of Historic Places in Schuylkill County, Pennsylvania